The 1873 Prince Edward Island election was held on 1 April 1873 to elect members of the House of Assembly of the British colony of Prince Edward Island. It was won by the Conservative party. This was Prince Edward Island's last general election as a British colony, as it joined Canada on July 1, 1873 as a province.

The election was held using 15 districts, each electing two members in separate contests.

One of the two members from each constituency was styled a Councillor, and the other an Assemblyman. In electoral contests Councillor candidates ran against Councillor candidates; Assemblyman candidates against Assemblyman candidates. Each seat was filled through First past the post.

References
 

Elections in Prince Edward Island
1873 elections in Canada
1873 in Prince Edward Island
April 1873 events